Lutz Benter (born 20 December 1945) is a German coxswain who represented West Germany.

He competed at the 1968 Summer Olympics in Mexico City with the men's coxed pair where they came sixth. At the 1969 European Rowing Championships in Klagenfurt, he won bronze with the men's eight. At the 1971 European Rowing Championships in Copenhagen, he came sixth with the men's eight.

His younger brother Uwe is also an Olympic coxswain; he won gold with the coxed four in 1972.

References

1945 births
Living people
German male rowers
Olympic rowers of West Germany
Rowers at the 1968 Summer Olympics
People from Rendsburg-Eckernförde
Coxswains (rowing)
European Rowing Championships medalists
Sportspeople from Schleswig-Holstein